Vatnestrøm is a village in Iveland municipality in Agder county, Norway. It is along Norwegian County Road 405, on the western shore of the lake Ogge.

References

Villages in Agder
Iveland
Setesdal